Robert Paterson was a Scottish footballer who played in the Football League for Derby County. Paterson played in the 1899 FA Cup Final defeat against Sheffield United.

References

Date of birth unknown
Date of death unknown
Scottish footballers
English Football League players
Association football midfielders
Clyde F.C. players
Derby County F.C. players
Coventry City F.C. players
FA Cup Final players